Emily Maguire ( Herbert; 1 April 1873 – 9 August 1961) was a New Zealand community worker, local politician and feminist. She was born in Burnley, Lancashire, England on 1 April 1873. She was a member of Auckland City Council from 1918 to 1923.

References

1873 births
1961 deaths
Unsuccessful candidates in the 1928 New Zealand general election
New Zealand feminists
English emigrants to New Zealand
New Zealand social workers
Auckland City Councillors